The long-toed myotis or Taiwan long-toed myotis (Myotis secundus) is a species of vesper bat endemic to Taiwan.

It was first discovered to science in 2003, and described in a 2015 study of the phylogenetics of Myotis bats of Taiwan and eastern China. It is thought to be most closely related to the Yanbaru whiskered bat (M. yanbarensis) of the Ryukyu Islands. Its specific epithet, secundus, references it being the second (at the time) undescribed Myotis known from Taiwan, the other being the reddish myotis (M. soror), which was later described alongside M. secundus. Despite its name, the long toes are not particularly distinctive compared to other Myotis species.

It is widespread throughout Taiwan, where it inhabits forested areas in both the mountains and eastern lowlands. It is not thought to be particularly threatened, and is thus classified as Least Concern by the IUCN Red List.

References 

Mouse-eared bats
Mammals of Taiwan
Endemic fauna of Taiwan
Bats of Asia
Mammals described in 2015